Amílcar Cabral is a documentary film directed by Ana Ramos Lisboa about African icon and martyr Amílcar Cabral.

Festivals
 7º FACT - Festival de Cine Africano, Spain (2010)
 Africa Vive, Spain (2010)
  AFRICA50 (2010)
 The Best of the African Diaspora Film Festival (2010)
  8th Annual Chicago African Diaspora Film Festival (2010)
 African Diaspora Film Festival, U.S.A.

See also
Amílcar Cabral
Ana Ramos Lisboa
Cinema of Cape Verde

External links
IMDb page about Amílcar Cabral

2001 films
Documentary films about revolutionaries
Documentary films about politicians
Films set in Cape Verde
Politics of Cape Verde
Cape Verdean documentary films
Portuguese documentary films
2001 documentary films
2000s Portuguese-language films